David S. Lee (李信麟; pinyin: Lǐ Xìnlín) is the CEO, president and Chairman of the Board of eOn Communications Corporation, a telecom services company based in Kennesaw, Georgia.  Lee was born in China around 1938.

Education
Lee received a B.S. in mechanical engineering from Montana State University in 1960.  He obtained an M.S. in the same field from North Dakota State University.  He has received an honorary doctorate from Montana State University in 1993.

Career
Lee has served as the CEO of eOn Communications Corporation since 2003 and has performed as the Chairman of the board of that company since 1991.  From 1985 to 1988, Lee was President and Chairman of Data Technology Corporation, a computer peripheral company. Prior to 1985, he was Group Executive and Chairman of the Business Information Systems Group of ITT Corporation.  He was also President of ITT subsidiary ITT Qume, formerly Qume Corporation, a computer systems peripherals company which Lee co-founded in 1973 prior to its acquisition by ITT Corporation in 1978.

Lee serves on the corporate boards of ESS Technology, Inc., Linear Technology, iBassis and Daily Wellness Company.

Public service
Lee was appointed to the board of the Regents of the University of California in 1994 and served his full term which ended 2006.  He has also been a member of the Board of Governors for California Community Colleges.

He was an advisor to Presidents Bush and Clinton on the Advisory Committee on Trade Policy and Negotiation (Office of the U.S. Trade Representative/Executive Office of the President) and to former Governor Wilson through the California Economic Development Corporation and the council on California Competitiveness. He is a member of the President's Council on the 21st Century Workforce, appointed by President George W. Bush.

Further reading

External links
Forbes magazine profile
UC Board of Regents bio
eOn Communications bio

Montana State University alumni
American people of Chinese descent
American chief executives
University of California regents
Members of Committee of 100
1930s births
Living people